Steve Roach may refer to:

 Steve Roach (musician) (born 1955), American ambient music composer
 Steve Roach (rugby league) (born 1962), Australian rugby league footballer
 Stephen S. Roach (born 1945), economist
 Stephen Roach (footballer) (born 1958), Australian rules footballer
 Steven Roach, American police officer who was involved in the 2001 Cincinnati riots
 Steve Roach, editor of Coin World magazine

See also 
 Stephen Roche (born 1959), Irish cyclist